There have been three baronetcies created for persons with the surname Pole, one in the Baronetage of England, one in the Baronetage of Great Britain and one in the Baronetage of the United Kingdom. Two of the creations are extant as of 2008.

Pole of Shute House
 
The Pole, later de-la-Pole, later Reeve-de-la-Pole Baronetcy, of Shute House in the County of Devon, was created in the Baronetage of England on 12 September 1628 for John Pole (died 1658), Member of Parliament for Devon. It was created during the lifetime of his father, the famous historian of Devon, Sir William Pole (d.1635), Knight, MP, of Colcombe Castle and Shute in Devon. The second Baronet was Member of Parliament for Honiton. The third Baronet represented Lyme Regis, Bossiney, Devon, East Looe and Newport in the House of Commons. The fourth Baronet was Member of Parliament for Newport, Camelford, Devon, Bossiney and Honiton. The sixth Baronet represented West Looe in Parliament. In 1790 he assumed the surname of de-la-Pole, which his successor discontinued. The eighth Baronet assumed in 1838 the surname of Reeve-de-la-Pole but later discontinued it. The tenth Baronet resumed the use of the surname of de-la-Pole. The eleventh Baronet was High Sheriff of Devon in 1917. The twelfth Baronet, who succeeded his kinsman in 1926, was the son of Lieutenant-General Sir Reginald Pole-Carew, eldest son of William Henry Pole-Carew, third son of the Right Honourable Reginald Pole-Carew, Member of Parliament for Lostwithiel (who assumed the additional surname of Carew), elder son of Reginald Pole, son of Reverend Carolus Pole, third son of the third Baronet, by his wife Sarah Rashleigh, daughter of Jonathan Rashleigh (1642–1702), of Menabilly, Cornwall, Sheriff of Cornwall in 1687 (of whom a portrait exists at Antony House), by his wife Jane Carew, daughter of Sir John Carew, 3rd Baronet (see Carew baronets). On his succession he assumed by deed poll the surname of Pole only in lieu of Pole-Carew. Pole was a Colonel in the Coldstream Guards, a member, chairman and Alderman of the Cornwall County Council and Lord-Lieutenant of Cornwall. As of 2008 the title is held by his son, the thirteenth Baronet, who succeeded in 1993. He has been a member of the Cornwall County Council, was High Sheriff of Cornwall in 1980 and is a Deputy Lieutenant of the county. See also the Pole Baronetcy of the Navy below.

Pole of Wolverton

The Pole, later Van Notten-Pole Baronetcy, of Wolverton in the County of Southampton, was created in the Baronetage of Great Britain on 28 July 1791 for Charles Pole, a London merchant. Born Charles Van Notten, he was the son of Charles Van Notten, a merchant, of Amsterdam and London, (who was a descendant of Charles Van-Notten, who was created Lord of Ath and Van der Notten by Emperor Charles V, only son of Henry Van Notten, who was ennobled by Emperor Maximilian I in 1499). He married in 1769, Millicent, daughter of Charles Pole, of Holcroft, a scion of an ancient family of Radbourne Hall, Derbyshire and in 1787 changed his surname to Pole. The baronetcy was created with remainder to the heirs male of his body, failing which to the heirs male of his daughter Susannah, wife of Isaac Minet (however, her male line is understood to have become extinct on the death of her son). His son, the second Baronet sat as Tory Member of Parliament for Yarmouth and sold Wolverton House to the Duke of Wellington in 1837. The third Baronet of Todenham House, Gloucestershire, was High Sheriff of Warwickshire in 1856. He assumed in 1853 by Royal licence the additional surname of Van Notten. This line of the family failed on the death of the fourth Baronet in 1948. He was succeeded by the fifth Baronet, a descendant of General Edward Pole, fourth son of the second Baronet. He uses the surname of Pole only.

Pole of the Navy

The Pole Baronetcy, of the Navy, was created in the Baronetage of the United Kingdom on 12 September 1801 for the naval commander Charles Pole. He was the younger son of Reginald Pole, son of Reverend Carolus Pole, third son of the third Baronet of the 1628 creation (see above). He had two daughters but no sons and on his death in 1830 the baronetcy became extinct.

Pole baronets, of Shute House (1628)

Sir John Pole, 1st Baronet (died 1658)
Sir Courtenay Pole, 2nd Baronet (1619–1695)
Sir John Pole, 3rd Baronet (1649–1708)
Sir William Pole, 4th Baronet (1678–1741)
Sir John Pole, 5th Baronet (–1760)
Sir John William de la Pole, 6th Baronet (1757–1799)
Sir William Templer Pole, 7th Baronet (1782–1847)
Sir John George Reeve-de la Pole, 8th Baronet (1808–1874)
Sir William Edmund de la Pole, 9th Baronet (1816–1895)
Sir Edmund Reginald Talbot de la Pole, 10th Baronet (1844–1912)
Sir Frederick Arundell de la Pole, 11th Baronet (1850–1926)
Sir John Gawen Carew Pole, 12th Baronet (1902–1993)
Sir (John) Richard Walter Reginald Carew Pole, 13th Baronet (born 1938)

The heir apparent is the present holder's son, Tremayne John Carew Pole (born February 1974).

Pole, later Van Notten-Pole baronets, of Wolverton (1791)
Sir Charles Pole, 1st Baronet (1735–1813)
Sir Peter Pole, 2nd Baronet (1770–1850)
Sir Peter Van Notten-Pole, 3rd Baronet (1801–1887)
Sir Cecil Pery Van Notten-Pole, 4th Baronet (1863–1948)
Sir Peter Van Notten Pole, 5th Baronet (1921–2010)
Sir (Peter) John Chandos Pole, 6th Baronet (born 1952)

The heir apparent is the present holder's son Michael Van Notten Pole.

Pole baronets, of the Navy (1801)
Sir Charles Morice Pole, 1st Baronet (1757–1830)

Notes

References

A Genealogical and Historical Dictionary of the Peerage and Baronetage of the British Empire Part 2 (1832) p305 John Burke. Google Books*Kidd, Charles, Williamson, David (editors). Debrett's Peerage and Baronetage (1990 edition). New York: St Martin's Press, 1990, 

Baronetcies in the Baronetage of England
Baronetcies in the Baronetage of Great Britain
Extinct baronetcies in the Baronetage of the United Kingdom
1628 establishments in England
1791 establishments in Great Britain
1801 establishments in the United Kingdom